Events in the year 2017 in Eritrea.

Incumbents 

 President: Isaias Afewerki

Events 

 1 November – In Asmara, 28 students are killed after police open fire on protestors during the Eritrean uprising.

Deaths

References 

 
2010s in Eritrea
Years of the 21st century in Eritrea
Eritrea
Eritrea